Jean Sennelier is a French slalom canoeist who competed from the late 1970s to the late 1980s. He won three medals at the ICF Canoe Slalom World Championships with two silvers (C-1 team: 1981, 1987) and a bronze (C-1: 1981).

References

French male canoeists
Living people
Year of birth missing (living people)
Medalists at the ICF Canoe Slalom World Championships